Bidjara, also spelt Bidyara or Pitjara, is an Australian Aboriginal language. In 1980, it was spoken by twenty elders in Queensland between the towns of Tambo and Augathella, or the Warrego and Langlo Rivers.  There are many dialects of the language, including Gayiri and Gunggari. Some of them are  being revitalised and is being taught in local schools in the region.

Dialects

The Bidjara language included numerous dialects, of which Bidjara proper was the last to go extinct. One of these was Gunya (Kunja), spoken over 31,200 km2 (12,188 sq mi), from the Warrego River near Cunnamulla north to Augathella and Burenda Station; west to between Cooladdi and Cheepie; east to Morven and Angellala Creek; at Charle-ville. Fred McKellar was the last known speaker. Yagalingu is poorly attested but may have been a dialect of Bidjara.

Natalie Kwok prepared a report on Gunggari for the National Native Title Tribunal in Australia.  In it she says:
Language served as an important identity marker between the Gunggari and Bidjara peoples. Although academically speaking, differences between the two languages have been found to be minor, from an emic point of view such distinctions were meaningful and consequential. Lynette Nixon recounts that when her father used to converse with the Gadd brothers it was understood that, although communication was possible, they each spoke in their own tongue. Ann-Eckermann recounts,

I was present many times when Bert Mailman (Bidjera) and Aunty Mini Dodd and Aunty Annie Currie would sit outside their houses calling out to one another in language – it was explained to me that Bert spoke Bidjera from Augathella and that the two old ladies were speaking Gunggari – and that, although some of the words were mutually intelligible, Bert really couldn't understand what the ladies were saying – and it was driving him crazy because the women were making fun of him. (pers. comm.)

The Wadjigu (also known as Wadja, Wadya, Wadjainngo, Mandalgu, and Wadjigun) language region includes the local government areas of the Aboriginal Shire of Woorabinda and Central Highlands Region, including the Blackdown Tablelands. the Comet River, and the Expedition Range, and the towns of Woorabinda, Springsure and Rolleston.

Language revival

Bidjara
Australian Bidjara artist Christian Bumbarra Thompson employs his Bidjara language in his video work in an attempt to redistribute his language into the public realm. His work Gamu Mambu, which means "Blood Song", is a video work of a Dutch Baroque opera singer singing in Bidjara. It was included in the 17th Sydney Biennale, The Beauty of Distance: Songs of Survival in a Precarious Age.

During NAIDOC Week in 2019, Bidjara man Owen Stanley shared his insights on the loss of language, and his sadness at not being fluent in his own language, with an audience at Uniting NSW. He said that his grandmother was one of the last 20 elders who died with the language, and attempts were being made to revive the language.

Gunggari
 there were only three native speakers of the Gunggari language left, including Elder of the Year Aunty Lynette Nixon, and a major language revival effort has been under way in Queensland schools since St Patrick's School in Mitchell started teaching it around 2013. Since then, Mitchell State School has also started teaching Gunggari. Aunty Lynette, along with the Gunggari Native Title Corporation (NTC), have been compiling the first Gunggari dictionary. Gunggari NTC have also developed language workshops, for adults to learn their people's language, holding the first off-country in Toowoomba.  they were planning to extend the workshops to Brisbane, Woorabinda and Mitchell.

Phonology 
The consonants in the Margany and Gunya dialects:

Vowels

Consonants 
Consonants are as follows:

References

External links 
 Bibliography of Bidjara language and people resources, at the Australian Institute of Aboriginal and Torres Strait Islander Studies
 Bibliography of Gayiri people and language resources, at the Australian Institute of Aboriginal and Torres Strait Islander Studies
 Bidyara Swadesh List at the Internet Archive
 Kuungkari, Bidjara, Inangai & Wangkangurru (Central West Region) community language journey digital story, at State Library of Queensland

Bidjara (Warrego River)
Maric languages
Extinct languages of Queensland